The Chief of Capability Development Group (CCDG) was head of the Capability Development Group (CDG) in the Australian Department of Defence, part of the Australian Defence Organisation. This position was created in December 2003 and disbanded through the amalgamation of the Capability Development Group and the Defence Materiel Organisation into the Defence Capability Acquisition and Sustainment Group from 2015. 

The appointed officer was responsible to the diarchy of the Chief of the Defence Force and the Secretary of Defence.

Capability Development Group

The role of the Capability Development Group (CDG) was to develop and gain Australian Government approval for future defence capabilities. The CDG has a close relationship with the Defence Materiel Organisation) and oversaw the implementation of Defence Procurement Review recommendations.

As sponsor, CDG was responsible for developing capability proposals consistent with strategic priorities, funding guidance, legislation and policy, for consideration and approval by Government. In particular, the work of the Group focused on:
Defence's Major Capability Expenditure (MCE) investment program; and
 Capability Definition, comprising the Needs Phase and the Requirements Phase of the Capability Development process.

CCDG, along with the Vice Chief of the Defence Force (VCDF), the Chief Finance Officer (CFO) and the Chief Defence Scientist (CDS), (all are 3 star level positions), comprised the Owner Support Executives.

Department heads
 Head Capability System: Vacant
 First assistant secretary capability investment & resources: Michael Gibson
 Assistant secretary capability & plans: Ben Coleman
 Executive director group support: Warren Nelson
 Director-General Australian defence test & evaluation office: CAPT John Renwick, RAN

Chief Capability Development Group

The following officers have been appointed as Chief of the Capability Development Group:

Timeline

References and notes

Notes

References

Leadership of the Australian Defence Force